cowsay is a program that generates ASCII art pictures of a cow with a message. It can also generate pictures using pre-made images of other animals, such as Tux the Penguin, the Linux mascot. It is written in Perl. There is also a related program called , with cows with thought bubbles rather than speech bubbles. .cow files for cowsay exist which are able to produce different variants of "cows", with different kinds of "eyes", and so forth. It is sometimes used on IRC, desktop screenshots, and in software documentation. It is more or less a joke within hacker culture, but has been around long enough that its use is rather widespread. In 2007, it was highlighted as a Debian package of the day.

Example
The Unix command  can also be piped into the  command:
[user@hostname ~]$ fortune | cowsay
 
/ You have Egyptian flu: you're going to \
\ be a mummy.                            /
 ----------------------------------------
        \   ^__^
         \  (oo)\___
            (__)\       )\/\
                ||----w |
                ||     ||

[user@hostname ~]$ fortune | cowsay -f tux
 _
/ You are only young once, but you can    \
\ stay immature indefinitely.             /
 -----------------------------------------
   \
    \
        .--.
       |o_o |
       |:_/ |
      //   \ \
     (|     | )
    /'\_   _/`\
    \___)=(___/

Using the parameter  shows all available cowfiles:
[user@hostname ~]$ cowsay -l
Cow files in /usr/share/cowsay/cows:
apt beavis.zen bong bud-frogs bunny calvin cheese cock cower daemon default
dragon dragon-and-cow duck elephant elephant-in-snake eyes flaming-sheep
ghostbusters gnu head-in hellokitty kiss kitty koala kosh luke-koala
mech-and-cow meow milk moofasa moose mutilated pony pony-smaller ren sheep
skeleton snowman sodomized-sheep stegosaurus stimpy suse three-eyes turkey
turtle tux unipony unipony-smaller vader vader-koala www

Parameters

References

External links
  
 

ASCII art
Free software programmed in Perl
Free and open-source Android software
Linux software
Unix software
Cattle in popular culture